Sonia Paço-Rocchia /so.ˈnja ˈpa.so ˈrɔ.kja/, born in 1982 in Montreal, is a composer, multidisciplinary artist, improviser, bassoonist and creative coder.

Biography
After graduating in mixed music composition from the Université de Montréal in 2005, she began her career in Europe, where she was based mainly in London. She later moved to the Laurentides region in Quebec. Her work has been shown in a dozen countries, including Canada, England and Belgium.

Sonia Paço-Rocchia's approach focuses on sounds, timbres and open musical forms. Her research includes the exploitation and expansion of the sound palettes of instruments through playing techniques or live electronics, inventing her own instruments and instrument automatons. Her pieces frequently involve a visual or theatrical aspect.

She regularly improvises with chamber ensembles, such as The Fantastique Quintet, VibraLib and ZzCc or as a soloist.

Work

Compositions 

 Justine et les machines, opera on a libretto by Marie-Ève Bouchard, commissioned by the 3 FEMMES prize by Mécénat Musica (2021-2022)
 Trouée, a work for baritone saxophone (doubling on piccolo), contrabass clarinet, two Tables de Babel (instrument by ), Orgue de sirène (instrument by ), percussion including an electric Lame, a Stemsaw  and a Flex-a-tone on stand, and multi-channel live electronics.
 Ode au métal is a work for saxophone quartet performing inside an installation, made of large metal pieces augmented with electronics, as well as quadraphonic live electronics. This work was commissioned by the saxophone quartet . (2019) 
 Si on l'ouvrait is a composition for alto flute, bass clarinet, violin, cello, piano, Flex on a stand, sensor boxes, projection automaton  and quadraphonic live electronics. (2019) 
 Nouvelle vie, nouvelle ville is a  created for the 375th anniversary of the founding of the city of Montreal. Commissioned by the Pointe à Callière Museum, it is a composition for brass quintet (Magnitude6), musical saw, Stemsaw, quadraphonic live electronics, train sirens, boats sirens and the carillon of Notre-Dame Basilica. (2017) 
 Said, live coding performance made with a live coding web platform developed by the artist, presented among others places at StudioXX (2017)  

 D’un autre côté, for guitar, harp, harpsichord, cymbalum, double bass, five Cubes that are sound triggers and live electronics. (2014)

 Hommage, for 32 bassoons around the public. (2011)

 Il temps-te, variations and improvisations avec theatricality, for cornet, flugelhorn, piccolo trumpet, trumpet and quadraphonic live electronics.  (2006)

 Soupirs, for solo clarinet, voice and live electronics.  (2005)

 CAM, for seven musicians playing Société de transport de Montréal metro cards, amplification on a quadraphonic setup. (2001)

Installations 

 When the Saws are Alone in the Woods, an automated musical saw quartet installed in a sugar maple forest that can be visited virtually and interacted with via a online poetic journey in which each choice influences the composition and the video. (2020)

 Flex, a sound, kinetic and interactive installation, an automated flexatone ensemble playing an interactive non-linear composition, presented in Curiosités sonores ambulantes (the artist's van-gallery). (2019, 2022)

 Ode au métal is a work for saxophone quartet performing inside an installation, made of large metal pieces augmented with electronics, as well as quadraphonic live electronics. This work was commissioned by the saxophone quartet . (2019)

 Réflexion a sound, visual and robotic installation with web-interactivity, an installation for automated moving mirrors, projection and non-linear composition presented at Agence Topo (2019)

 Lames, site-specific interactive sound installation for automated musical saw ensemble, commissioned by Centre Daïmôn, Hull, for the Interstices 150th of Confederation event (2017),  presented at Electric Eclectics Festival, Meaford and at NAISA, South River.

 Scies, interactive sound installation with generative non-linear composition for ensemble of sound automatons made from circular saw blades (2016), presented at Modern Fuel Gallery during Tone Deaf. 
 Hélix, a site-specific interactive sound installation with up to twenty Helixophone automatons, an instrument based on the Slinky invented by the artist (2013) Hélix was presented at City Sonic, Mons, Carré 150 during Festival International de Musique Actuelle de Victoriaville, Quai 5160, Montréal, PHOS, Espace F, Matane, Centre d'art visuel d'Alberta, Edmonton, among others.

Exhibitions

Solo exhibitions
 Centre d'exposition de Val David, Québec (online) (2020)
 NAISA, South River, Ontario (2019)
 Agence Topo, Montreal, Quebec (2019)
 Centre d’art visuel d’Alberta, Edmonton (2018)
 Quai 5160, Verdun, Quebec (2017-2018)
 Carré 150, Victoriaville, Quebec (2017)
 Transcultures, Mons, Belgique (2013)

Group exhibitions
 Electric Eclectics Festival, Meaford, Ontario (2019)
 Traverse, Atelier de l'île, Val David, Quebec (2019)
 PHOS, Espace F, Matane, Quebec (2018)
 Interstices, Daïmôn, Hull, Quebec (2017)
 Festival International de Musique Actuelle de Victoriaville, Québec (2017)
 Tone Deaf, Modern Fuel, Kingston, Ontario (2016)

 Hörlursfestival, Sollefteå, Sweden (2013)
 City Sonic and Park in Progress, International sound art festival, Mons, Belgium (2013)
 Installation sur le Slinky version pour la Croatie, Vrijeme nakon 2011, Gallery Kortil, Rijeka, Croatia (2011)
 Leytonstone Arts Trail, London (2010)
 Interactive Sound Installation on Living Room Scale Installation by Takako Jin, during Leytonstone Art Trail, London (2009)
 A Cup of Tea Solves Everything, London (2009)

Discography 
 Sonia Paço-Rocchia, Improvisation For Bicycle
 LIO LEO LEON, Emanem Disc
 Cornelius Cardew – The Great Learning
 Hutch Demouilpied – Otherness Album
Avant-garde-robe

Awards and recognition
 Finalist for the Artiste de l'année des Laurentides award from the Conseil des arts et des lettres du Québec
 Winner of the Mécénat Musica's 3 FEMMES award 2020-2021 
 Winner of the Prix Jeune relève in visual art,   in 2018 for her work as a whole

External links

Canadian Music Centre, composer's page

RAAV/CARFAC artist's page

References

Notes

Sources

Experimental composers
Avant-garde composers
Canadian contemporary classical composers
Canadian women composers
21st-century Canadian composers
21st-century women composers
Composers for flute
Women opera composers
Canadian opera composers
Electroacoustic music composers
Canadian electronic musicians
Live coding
Free improvising musicians
Electroacoustic improvisation
Free improvisation
Canadian bassoonists
Canadian sound artists
Interdisciplinary artists
Artists from Quebec
Canadian women artists
Kinetic art
Net.artists
Women digital artists
Interactive art
Women installation artists
Canadian installation artists
1982 births
Living people